First Church of Christ, Scientist, built in 1907, is an historic Christian Science church building located at 406-408 Middle Street, in New Bern, Craven County, North Carolina, in the United States. It was designed in the Classical Revival style by prolific local architect Herbert Woodley Simpson.

On October 2, 1973, it was added to the National Register of Historic Places.
 
First Church of Christ, Scientist, New Bern,  is still an active Christian Science congregation.

See also
List of Registered Historic Places in North Carolina
 First Church of Christ, Scientist (disambiguation)

References

External links
Official website
 National Register listings for Craven County
 New Bern Historical Society: Church plan
 New Bern Historical Society:Church exterior photo
 New Bern Historical Society:Church portico photo
 Churches & Cemeteries Tour

Churches on the National Register of Historic Places in North Carolina
Christian Science churches in North Carolina
Churches in New Bern, North Carolina
Churches completed in 1907
20th-century Christian Science church buildings
National Register of Historic Places in Craven County, North Carolina